94 may refer to: 
 94 (number)
 one of the years 94 BC, AD 94, 1994, 2094, etc.
 Atomic number 94: plutonium
 Saab 94

See also
 
 List of highways numbered